County Hall is a municipal facility at Riverside, Sligo, County Sligo, Ireland.

History
Originally meetings of Sligo County Council were held at Sligo Courthouse. The county council moved to modern facilities at Riverside in June 1979. The building was substantially re-modeled, to a design by Murray O'Laoire, to create a new council chamber and reception area: the new facilities were opened by Noel Dempsey, Minister for the Environment and Local Government, in June 2001.

References

Buildings and structures in County Sligo
Sligo